In Greek mythology, Corcyra  or Korkyra (Ancient Greece: Κόρκυρα means ') was the naiad daughter of the Asopos river and the nymph Metope, daughter of the river-god Ladon.

Family 
Korykra was the sister of Pelasgus (Pelagon), Ismenus, Chalcis, Cleone, Salamis, Sinope, Aegina, Peirene, Thebe, Tanagra, Thespia, Asopis, Ornea, Harpina, Antiope, Nemea and Plataea (Oeroe).

Mythology 

According to myth, Poseidon fell in love with the beautiful nymph Korkyra, kidnapped her and brought her to a hitherto unnamed island (Scheria) and offered her name to the place: Korkyra or the now-modern Kerkyra (known in English as Corfu, a name that is unrelated by origin)."Next after them they came to Corcyra, where Poseidon settled the daughter of Asopus, fair-haired Corcyra, far from the land of Phlious, whence he had carried her off through love; and sailors beholding it from the sea, all black with its sombre woods, call it Corcyra the Black."Together they had a child Phaiax after whom the inhabitants of the island, Phaiakes, were named; their name was later transliterated in Latinate orthography to Phaeacians.

Notes

References 

 Apollodorus, The Library with an English Translation by Sir James George Frazer, F.B.A., F.R.S. in 2 Volumes, Cambridge, MA, Harvard University Press; London, William Heinemann Ltd. 1921. ISBN 0-674-99135-4. Online version at the Perseus Digital Library. Greek text available from the same website.
 Apollonius Rhodius, Argonautica translated by Robert Cooper Seaton (1853-1915), R. C. Loeb Classical Library Volume 001. London, William Heinemann Ltd, 1912. Online version at the Topos Text Project.
 Apollonius Rhodius, Argonautica. George W. Mooney. London. Longmans, Green. 1912. Greek text available at the Perseus Digital Library.
 Diodorus Siculus, The Library of History translated by Charles Henry Oldfather. Twelve volumes. Loeb Classical Library. Cambridge, Massachusetts: Harvard University Press; London: William Heinemann, Ltd. 1989. Vol. 3. Books 4.59–8. Online version at Bill Thayer's Web Site
 Diodorus Siculus, Bibliotheca Historica. Vol 1-2. Immanel Bekker. Ludwig Dindorf. Friedrich Vogel. in aedibus B. G. Teubneri. Leipzig. 1888–1890. Greek text available at the Perseus Digital Library.

Naiads
Nymphs
Children of Asopus
Phaeacians in Greek mythology